This is a list of manhua publishers around the world.

Brazil
 Panini Comics
 Conrad Editora

France
 Xiao Pan
 Glénat
 Urban China

Hong Kong
 HK Comics Ltd.
 Culturecom Holdings Limited
 The One Comics Publishing Ltd

Indonesia
 M&C Comics

Singapore
 TCZ Studio

Taiwan
 Sharp Point Publishers

United Kingdom
 Bamboo Press Ltd

United States
 ComicsOne
 DrMaster
 Tokyopop
 Yen Press
Comikey

References

Manhua
Manhua distributors